Tridentine is the adjectival form of Trent, Italy.

It also refers to:
The Council of Trent and what followed it
The Tridentine calendar
The Tridentine Mass

See also
 Counter-Reformation
 List of communities using the Tridentine Mass
 Pre-Tridentine Mass
 Traditionalist Catholicism